Sason District is a district of the Batman Province of Turkey. Its seat is the town Sason. Its area is 706 km2, and its population is 30,182 (2021). It was formerly part of the sanjak of Siirt, which was in Diyarbakır vilayet until 1880 and in Bitlis Vilayet in 1892. Later it became part of Muş sanjak in Bitlis vilayet, and remained part of Muş until 1927. It was one of the districts of Siirt province until 1993. The boundaries of the district varied considerably in time. The current borders are not the same as in the 19th century, when the district of Sasun was situated more to the north (mostly territory now included in the central district of Muş).

Composition
There are two municipalities in Sason District:
 Sason
 Yücebağ

There are 54 villages in Sason District:

 Acar
 Altındere
 Balbaşı
 Bayramlar
 Boğazkapı
 Cevizli
 Çağlı
 Çakırpınar
 Çalışırlar
 Çayırlı
 Çınarlı
 Dağçatı
 Dereiçi
 Dereköy
 Derince
 Dikbayır
 Dörtbölük
 Ekinlik
 Ergünü
 Erikli
 Geçitli
 gnçler
 Gürgenli
 Güvercinlik
 Heybeli
 İncesu
 Kaleyolu
 Karameşe
 Karayün
 Kaşyayla
 Kavaklı
 Kayadüzü
 Kelhasan
 Kilimli
 Kilis
 Kınalı
 Köprübaşı
 Kulaksız
 Meşeli
 Örenağıl
 Sarıyayla
 Soğanlı
 Taşyuva
 Topluca
 Turnalı
 Umurlu
 Yakabağ
 Yeniköy
 Yiğitler
 Yolüstü
 Yuvalar
 Yürekli
 Yuvalıçay
 Ziyaret

References

Districts of Batman Province